The Chiesa di Santa Maria della Pace is a church in Milan, Italy. It was built in 1497.

Roman Catholic churches completed in 1497
Maria
Tourist attractions in Milan
15th-century Roman Catholic church buildings in Italy